Zuo Shuzhang (左庶长, Chief of the Multitude on the Left) was a rank in the bureaucracy and nobility of ancient China. During the Warring States period it denoted a high rank in the State of Qin.  During the Han Dynasty it denoted the tenth of twenty orders of aristocratic rank.

References

Chinese nobility